Dumra is a town and a notified area in Sitamarhi district in Bihar, India. Dumra is the headquarter of Sitamarhi district. It has approximately 16 wards.

There is a small railway station situated in Dumra.

Geography
It has an average elevation of 86 metres (282 feet).

Demographics
 India census, Dumra is a Census Town city in district of Sitamarhi, Bihar. The Dumra Census Town has population of 326,332 of which 173,053 are males while 153,279 are females as per report released by Census India 2011.

Education
 
Springdales International Girls' School, Sitamarhi
Brilliant Public School Sitamarhi
Delhi Public School Lagma
Hellen's School Sitamarhi
Janki Vidya Niketan
Kamala-Girls High School
Kendriya Vidyalaya
Lakshmi High School
N.S.D.A.V.Public School
Mathura High School
Sacred Heart School, Sitamarhi
 Saraswati Vidya Mandir, Ring bandh
 Sitamarhi High School (MP High School)

References

Cities and towns in Sitamarhi district